Flushed Away is a 2006 computer-animated adventure comedy film directed by Sam Fell and David Bowers (in their directorial debut), produced by Cecil Kramer, David Sproxton, and Peter Lord, and written by Dick Clement, Ian La Frenais, Chris Lloyd, Joe Keenan and Will Davies. It was the third and final DreamWorks Animation film co-produced with Aardman Features following Chicken Run (2000) and Wallace & Gromit: The Curse of the Were-Rabbit (2005), and was the first Aardman project completely made in CGI animation as opposed to their usual stop-motion. The film stars the voices of Hugh Jackman, Kate Winslet, Ian McKellen, Shane Richie, Bill Nighy, Andy Serkis and Jean Reno. In the film, a pampered pet rat named Roddy St. James (Jackman) is flushed down the toilet in his Kensington apartment by a sewer rat named Sid (Richie), and befriends a scavenger named Rita Malone (Winslet) in order to get back home while evading a sinister toad (McKellen) and his hench-rats (Nighy and Serkis).

The idea about rats that fall in love in sewers was created by animator Fell during the production of Chicken Run. In 2001, Fell developed the concept into a story before pitching it to DreamWorks. The project was first announced in July 2002, followed with comic writing duo Clement and La Frenais contracted to write the script, which had the working title Ratropolis. In 2003, Bowers joined in to direct the film with Fell. Because using real water can damage plasticine models, it is complex to render water with this technique, so they chose to make a computer-animated film.

The film was released in the United States by Paramount Pictures on 3 November 2006, and in the United Kingdom by United International Pictures on 1 December. Despite receiving positive reviews, Flushed Away underperformed at the box office, prompting DreamWorks to end their partnership with Aardman and a $109-million write-down. It grossed over $178 million worldwide against its $149 million budget. The film received nominations for the BAFTA Award and Critics' Choice Award for Best Animated Feature. It also got 8 nominations at the 34th Annie Awards, winning a leading 5, including Writing in a Feature Production, and Voice Acting in a Feature Production award for Ian McKellen. The film would serve as Aardman's biggest box office failure until 2018, as Early Man earned less money that year.

Plot 
Roddy St. James is a pampered pet mouse who lives in a large Kensington apartment. While his owners are away on holiday, a sewer rat named Sid spews out of the sink's drain and decides to stay and watch the 2006 FIFA World Cup Final. Roddy attempts to get rid of Sid by flushing him down the toilet, but Roddy instead gets flushed down the sewers by Sid.

Roddy finds himself in Ratropolis, a sewer city made out of various bits of junk that resembles London. He is told to seek out Rita Malone, an enterprising scavenger mouse who works the drains in her faithful boat, the Jammy Dodger who can possibly help him get home. Roddy and Rita are abducted by rats Spike and Whitey and brought before their boss, the Toad, as Rita stole back a prized ruby originally scavenged by her father. The Toad plans to have Roddy and Rita frozen with liquid nitrogen, but the pair escape. Rita takes the ruby, and a unique electric master cable required to control Ratropolis' sewer floodgates.

Roddy deduces that the ruby is a fake and easily shatters it, enraging Rita. Roddy offers Rita a real ruby if she takes him back to Kensington, to which she agrees. The pair first stop to visit her family before setting off. During Roddy's stay, he overhears a conversation that causes him to assume that Rita is selling him out to the Toad, so he reneges on the deal and steals the Jammy Dodger. When Rita catches up to him, she is able to clear up the misunderstanding. The pair evade pursuit from Spike, Whitey, and their accomplices.

Incensed at his minions' repeated failures, the Toad sends for his French cousin, Le Frog. It is revealed that the Toad was Prince Charles' favorite childhood pet until he was abruptly replaced by a rat and flushed down a toilet, resulting in his hatred of rodents. Le Frog and his subordinates intercept Roddy and Rita to retrieve the cable, but the duo manages to escape out of the sewer drain and back to Roddy's apartment, though the Jammy Dodger is destroyed.

Roddy pays Rita the promised ruby and an emerald, then shows her around his apartment. She at first believes he has family, but notices his cage and realizes he is a pet and alone. Rita tries to persuade Roddy to come with her, but he is too proud to admit his loneliness and rebuffs her. Rita leaves the apartment via the toilet only for her to be captured, with the Toad taking back the master cable. Roddy joins Sid to watch the game. When Sid mentions half-time, Roddy pieces together the Toad's plan: to open the floodgates during half-time of the World Cup, when all the humans will most likely be using their toilets, allowing the ensuing, enormous wave of drainage to destroy Ratropolis, allowing the Toad to use the depopulated city as a home for his tadpole children. Roddy entrusts Sid with his home and cushy position, and has Sid flush him back down the sewers again. He frees Rita, and together they defeat the Toad and his henchman by getting Toad and Le Frog’s tongues stuck to moving gears and freeze the wave of drainage with liquid nitrogen. Hailed as a hero, Roddy agrees to stay in Ratropolis with Rita. Soon after, the two, as well as Rita's family, set off on the Jammy Dodger II.

In a post-credits scene, Sid continues to relax at his new home in Kensington. However, when Roddy’s owners return, the daughter, Tabitha, finds Sid on the couch and introduces him to their new cat.

Voice cast 
 Hugh Jackman as Roddy St. James, a pampered but lonely pet mouse who lives in a Kensington luxury apartment with a wealthy British family. He is flushed down the toilet by Sid the sewer rat into the sewer drains.
 Kate Winslet as Rita Malone, a street-wise and rather aloof scavenger mouse and the oldest child of a large family. She is the captain of The Jammy Dodger and Roddy's eventual girlfriend.
 Ian McKellen as the Toad, the main antagonist of the film and a tyrannical amphibian who wants rid of the entire population of Ratropolis to make room for his hundreds of offspring. For his performance, Ian McKellen won the Annie Award for Voice Acting in a Feature Production.
 Jean Reno as Le Frog, the Toad's French cousin. He refers to the Toad as "my warty English cousin". He masters martial arts and is the leader of a team of hench-frogs.
 Andy Serkis as Spike, one of the Toad's two top hench-rats. He is the quicker-witted and more aggressive of the two.
 Bill Nighy as Whitey, another of the Toad's two top hench-rats. Whitey is an albino rat, and Spike's partner. Unlike Spike, Whitey is sympathetic and less vicious but is also ignorant and gullible.
 Shane Richie as Sid, an over-weight and lazy sewer rat from the sewer drain. He is the one who flushes Roddy down his own toilet  and is an acquaintance of Rita and her family. 
 Kathy Burke and David Suchet as Mr. and Mrs. Malone respectively, Rita's parents
 Miriam Margolyes as Rita's grandmother, who has a crush on Roddy mistaking him for Tom Jones.
 Rachel Rawlinson as Tabitha, Roddy's former human owner.
 Christopher Fairbank as Thimblenose Ted, another henchman that serves as the Toad's third-best enforcer after Spike and Whitey. Fairbank also voiced the cockroach living in the Malone household.

Production 
The idea for a film about rats that fall in love in sewers was proposed by animator Sam Fell during the production of Aardman Animation's Chicken Run (2000). At the time, Aardman encouraged everyone at the company to come up with ideas for features for the DreamWorks partnership. In 2001, Fell, development executive Mike Cooper, and producer Peter Lord then developed the concept into a story before pitching it to DreamWorks. The film was first announced in July 2002, and in what was then a surprise move, it was revealed as being Aardman's very first CGI feature project. Lord described the pitch as "The African Queen with the gender roles reversed". After the film was announced, Comic writing duo Dick Clement and Ian La Frenais were contracted to write the script, which had the working title Ratropolis. In 2003, David Bowers joined in to direct the film with Fell.

Traditionally, Aardman has used stop-motion for their animated features, but it is complex to render water with this technique, and using real water can damage plasticine models. It would have been expensive to composite CGI into shots that include water, of which there are many in the movie, so they chose to make Flushed Away their first all-CGI production. This is the third and final of three Aardman-produced films released by DreamWorks. Aardman's turbulent experience with DreamWorks during the making of this film and The Curse of the Were-Rabbit led to the split between the two studios.

Soundtrack 
On Halloween (31 October) 2006, the Flushed Away: Music from the Motion Picture soundtrack was released by Astralwerks.

Home media 
Flushed Away was released on DVD 20 February 2007. It includes behind the scenes, deleted info, Jammy Dodger videos and all-new slug songs. It was released in the UK on 2 April 2007, where it was also packaged with a plasticine 'Slug Farm' kit. The film was released on Blu-ray by Universal Pictures Home Entertainment on 4 June 2019. As of October 2010, 4.9 million units were sold.

In July 2014, the film's distribution rights were purchased by DreamWorks Animation from Paramount Pictures and transferred to 20th Century Fox before reverting to Universal Studios in 2018.

Reception

Critical response 
The site's critical consensus reads "Clever and appealing for both children and adults, Flushed Away marks a successful entry into digitally animated features for Aardman Animations." Metacritic, which assigns a weighted average score to reviews from mainstream critics, gives the film a score of 74 out of 100 based on 28 reviews, indicating "generally favorable reviews". Audiences polled by CinemaScore gave the film an average grade of "B+" on an A+ to F scale.

Todd McCarthy of Variety gave the film a negative review, saying "As directed by David Bowers and Sam Fell, first-time feature helmers with long-term Aardman affiliations, the film boasts undeniably smart and eye-catching qualities that are significantly diluted by the relentlessly frantic and overbearing behavior of most characters; someone is always loudly imposing himself upon another, to diminishing returns of enjoyment." Owen Gleiberman of Entertainment Weekly gave the film a B+, saying "Flushed Away lacks the action-contraption dottiness of a Wallace and Gromit adventure, but it hits its own sweet spot of demented delight." James Berardinelli of ReelViews gave the film three out of four stars, saying "It's better than 90% of the animated fare of the last few years. It's refreshing not to have to qualify the movie's appeal by appending the words, 'for the kids'." Jan Stuart of Newsday gave the film two out of four stars, saying "Despite the efforts of five writers and Aardman's trademark puppets, with their malleable eyebrows and cheeks bulging like those of a mumps sufferer, none of these characters are particularly endearing." Ann Hornaday of The Washington Post gave the film a positive review, saying "Flushed Away, Aardman's first computer-generated cartoon, does away with the clay but leaves the craft and emotion intact, resulting in a film that earns its place among the Aardman classics." Peter Hartlaub of the San Francisco Chronicle gave the film three out of four stars, saying "The short attention spans of directors David Bowers and Sam Fell are mostly forgivable because the movie is filled with so many entertaining characters."

Richard Corliss of Time gave the film a negative review, saying "Deficient in the comedy of reticence discouragement that is Aardman's (or maybe just Nick Park's) unique strength. I don't want to say the Englishmen were corrupted, but I think they allowed their strongest, quirkiest instincts to be tethered." Ted Fry of The Seattle Times gave the film three and a half stars out of four, saying "Fans of Wallace and Gromit may be puzzled by a visual disconnect in Flushed Away. They will certainly, however, be delighted by the unrelenting whimsy and fast-paced gags of a story that never slows down to think about where it's going next." Ty Burr of The Boston Globe gave the film two and a half stars out of five, saying "Kids will probably be in stinky-sewage heaven with the new computer-animated critter comedy Flushed Away, but even they may realize they're up the proverbial creek in a boat with a faulty motor." Jack Mathews of the New York Daily News gave the film two and a half stars out of four, saying "Though Flushed Away duplicates the stop-motion, clay animation look of Aardman's earlier Chicken Run and Wallace & Gromit, it was made using computer software and its liberated action sequences are truly dazzling." Kyle Smith of the New York Post gave the film three out of four stars, saying "How this thing got made in Hollywood is a mystery, but I laughed at most of it, especially the mean stereotypes about the French and the even meaner stereotype about England's soccer team."

Box office 
Flushed Away collected $64.6 million in the United States, which was below the average of other CGI films from DreamWorks Animation, and $113.6 million from international markets for a worldwide total of $178.2 million, making it the 24th highest grossing film of 2006, and the sixth Highest-Grossing Animated film of 2006. The film opened to number three in its first weekend, with $18,814,323, behind Borat and The Santa Clause 3: The Escape Clause. Produced on a budget of $149 million, poor box office reception resulted in a $109-million write-down for DreamWorks Animation, and in turn a termination of the partnership with Aardman Animations.

Video game 

Coinciding with the film's release, a video game adaptation was released on the PlayStation 2, Nintendo GameCube, Game Boy Advance, and on the Nintendo DS. Although having heavily negative reviews from critics, the game received an Annie Award for best animated video game.

References

External links 

 
 
 
 
 
 
 

2006 films
2006 computer-animated films
2006 directorial debut films
2000s adventure comedy films
2000s American animated films
Aardman Animations films
American action comedy films
American adventure comedy films
American children's animated comedy films
American computer-animated films
Animated buddy films
Animated films about rats
British buddy comedy films
British children's animated films
British children's comedy films
DreamWorks Animation animated films
Films scored by Harry Gregson-Williams
Films directed by David Bowers
Films directed by Sam Fell
Animated films about mice
Animated films set in London
Paramount Pictures films
Paramount Pictures animated films
Flushed Away
Films with screenplays by William Davies
Films with screenplays by Dick Clement
Films with screenplays by Ian La Frenais
2006 comedy films
Films set in England
Films set in London
Animated television series about mice and rats
2000s English-language films
2000s British films